Hugo Birger (born Hugo Birger Peterson) (12 January 1854 – 17 June 1887) was a Swedish painter.

Biography
Born in Stockholm, his father was printmaker S. A. Peterson. Birger studied at the Royal Swedish Academy of Arts from 1870 to 1877. In 1877, he was awarded with the "Royal medal" for his painting Syndafallet. It was praised for its strong colors and shininess.

Birger moved to Paris in 1877, and spent the summer of 1878 in Barbizon with Carl Larsson and Carl Skånberg. He debuted at the Paris Salon the following year with Rue Gabrielle (1879, now in the Gothenburg Museum of Art). He submitted his painting Toaletten (English: The Toilet), which depicts a lady in front of the toilet mirror, to the Paris Salon in 1880. From 1881 to 1882, Birger visited Spain and Northern Africa. His largest painting from Spain was La feria ("The Feast Day", 1882, Gothenburg Museum of Art), which depicts a breakfast in Granada.

After 1882, Birger spent time in Paris, in Gothenburg, and at the Swedish west coast, where he studied the cliffs and the fjords. In Paris at the end of 1886, Birger made his largest painting ever, Frukosten hos Ledoyen. It depicts several famous Nordic painters having breakfast together on the day of the Paris Salon's opening. It was a common tradition for the painters to gather on that day and have breakfast at the Ledoyen restaurant to celebrate the opening of the Paris Salon. Birger made sketches of the breakfast while it took place, and later had all the painters sit model for him in his atelier. He submitted Frukosten hos Ledoyen to the Paris Salon in 1886, hoping that it would win first prize. It did not, however, and Richard Bergh was awarded with first prize.

Birger suffered from health issues in 1887 and died at Hotel Mollberg in Helsingborg, Sweden, on 17 June 1887, on his way home from France.

Hugo Birger is buried at "Nya kyrkogården" (the new cemetery) in Helsingborg, near the chapel. The grave stone was previously adorned with a relief made by the good friend Carl Larsson. Due to an increasing number of thefts in the area, the original relief was removed in 2008 and is now replaced by a copy.

The largest collection of Birger's paintings is in the  Gothenburg Museum of Art, but some can also be seen at the National Museum of Arts in Stockholm. During his career, Birger made portraits of famous painters such as Alfred Wahlberg, Albert Edenfeldt, Per Hasselberg, Robert Thegerström, Carl Larsson, Georg Pauli, and Ernst Josephson.

Birger was married to Mathilda Gadea, whom he met in Granada in Spain.

Gallery

References

19th-century Swedish painters
Swedish male painters
Artists from Stockholm
1854 births
1887 deaths
19th-century Swedish male artists